Bertrand de Loque, author of Deux Traitéz: l'un de la guerre, l'autre du duel (Lyon: Iacob Ratoyre, 1589), Protestant minister, is said to be the same person as François de Saillans, who was born in Valence between 1540 and 1550. Loque was still alive in 1600.

References
For a translation into modern English, see Beatrice Heuser: The Strategy Makers: Thoughts on War and Society from Machiavelli to Clausewitz (Santa Monica, CA: Greenwood/Praeger, 2010) , pp. 50–61

16th-century births
17th-century deaths
French Calvinist and Reformed ministers
Protestant writers
French didactic writers
16th-century French writers
16th-century male writers
French male non-fiction writers